Jitendra Singh may refer to:
 Jitendra Singh (politician, born 1956), Bharatiya Janata Party politician
 Jitendra Singh (politician, born 1971), Indian National Congress politician
 Jitendra Singh (BSP) or Jitendra Kumar Bablu Bhaiya, Bahujan Samaj Party politician
 Jitendra Singh (cricketer) (born 1965), Indian cricketer
 Jitendra Singh (footballer) (born 2001), Indian footballer
 Jitendra Kumar Singh (born 1952), Indian oncologist